Papineau is a surname. Notable people with the surname include:

Joseph Papineau, 19th-century Quebec politician
Louis-Joseph Papineau, son of Joseph Papineau, also a 19th-century Quebec politician; headed the 1837 rebellions against the British government in Canada
Amédée Papineau, son of Louis Joseph Papineau
Denis-Benjamin Papineau, son of Joseph Papineau, was a Joint Premier of the Province of Canada
Talbot Mercer Papineau, Rhodes scholar and soldier, died in the Great War
David Papineau, British philosopher of mind and science
Justin Papineau, Canadian ice hockey player